John W. Sweeny, Jr. is  retired Associate Justice of the New York Appellate Division of the Supreme Court, First Judicial Department.

Early life and education
He is a 1971 graduate of University of Notre Dame. He received his JD from Fordham University School of Law in 1974.

Legal career
Prior to joining the bench, he was worked in private practice. He also served as Law Secretary to State Supreme Court Justices John P. Donohoe and Fred A. Dickinson. He was also an Administrative Assistant District Attorney for Putnam County.

He subsequently served as a County Court Judge, acting Supreme Court Justice, and New York Supreme Court Justice, from 1987 to 2004. He was designated a Justice for the Appellate Division, First Judicial Department in 2004 by Governor George Pataki and served until his retirement in December 2019.

References

Living people
New York (state) lawyers
1949 births